The Minister of State for Care and Mental Health was a ministerial position within the Government of the United Kingdom, in charge of mental health and social care policy.

History

Social care 

In 2006, Ivan Lewis was appointed Minister of State for Care Services in the Department of Health. He was succeeded in the position by Phil Hope in 2008. Following the 2010 general election, Paul Burstow of the Liberal Democrats served as minister for two years before being replaced by Norman Lamb as Minister of State for Care and Support.

After the Conservative victory in the 2015 general election, Alistair Burt was appointed Minister of State for Community and Social Care. The position was given to David Mowat and renamed as Parliamentary Under-Secretary of State for Care and Support. After Mowat lost his Warrington South seat at the 2017 general election, the position remained vacant. In 2018 Caroline Dinenage was appointed as the new Minister of State for Social Care. During the 2020 reshuffle, Helen Whately was appointed as Dinenage's successor.

Mental health 

Following the general election in June 2017, Jackie Doyle-Price was appointed as Parliamentary Under-Secretary of State for Mental Health and Inequalities, the country's first mental health minister. The portfolio was expanded on World Mental Health Day 2018 to become Parliamentary Under-Secretary of State for Mental Health, Inequalities and Suicide Prevention. 

In July 2019, Nadine Dorries was appointed as Parliamentary Under-Secretary of State for Patient Safety, Suicide Prevention and Mental Health in the incoming Johnson ministry. In May 2020, the position was raised from Parliamentary Under-Secretary of State to Minister of State, to become Minister of State for Patient Safety, Suicide Prevention and Mental Health.

Appointment 
In September 2021, Gillian Keegan was appointed as Minister of State for Care and Mental Health, a new position which combined the mental health and social care portfolios.

In September 2022, the social care and mental health portfolios were divided. Robert Jenrick was appointed as Minister of State for Health and Caroline Johnson as Parliamentary Under-Secretary of State for Mental Health and Public Health.

Responsibilities 
The Minister of State for Care and Mental Health led on the following:
 adult social care
 health and care integration
 dementia, disabilities and long-term conditions
 NHS Continuing Healthcare
 mental health
 suicide prevention and crisis prevention
 offender health
 vulnerable groups
 bereavement

Minister

See also 
 Department of Health and Social Care
 Mental health minister

References 

Health ministers of the United Kingdom
Department of Health and Social Care
Health in the United Kingdom
Social care in England
Social care in England and Wales
Mental health in the United Kingdom
Suicide prevention